Fredric Tomczyk is a businessman who was formerly the president and chief executive officer of TD Ameritrade from 2008 to 2016. He served on the company’s Board of Directors from January 2006 until June 2007.  Before that he served as vice chair of corporate operations for TD Bank Group, executive vice president of retail distribution for TD Canada Trust, and president and chief executive officer of wealth management for TD Bank. Before joining TD Bank, he was president and chief executive officer of London Life Insurance Company.
Tomczyk has graduated from Cornell University and has a  Chartered Accountant designation. He became an elected Fellow of the Institute of Chartered Accountants of Ontario in 2006.

References

Cornell University alumni
Living people
Year of birth missing (living people)